Blodveien (The Blood Road) is a Norwegian-Yugoslav drama film from 1955 directed by Kåre Bergstrøm and Radoš Novaković. The script was written by Sigurd Evensmo. The film premiered in Norway on February 17, 1955.

Plot
Blodveien portrays the conditions that Yugoslav (mostly Serbian) slave laborers and prisoners of war lived under in Northern Norway in 1942 during the Second World War, when the Germans wanted to build the route known as the "Blood Road" (today part of European route E6 among other routes).

Two local Norwegian friends and construction workers, Ketil and Ivar, serve as construction supervisors on the road under pressure from the Germans. They had earlier helped build the small concentration camp that prisoners later lived in, without understanding what they were involved in. The prisoners are sympathetic toward them because they try to help them to the extent that they can. The Germans take harsh revenge after an escape attempt by shooting some of the prisoners. The Germans, led by the sadistic Schwarz, terrorize and kill prisoners at random almost daily.

Ketil's young son Magnar is bored at home on the small mountain farm and wants to get out and do something with his life. He enlists with the German forces and is made a guard at the prison camp. The prisoner Janko escapes from the camp after being shot by Schwarz. He receives help along the way after his dramatic escape, and is on his way over the mountains toward neutral Sweden when he is captured by Magnar and brought at gunpoint back to the prison camp. Magnar's father Ketil, who was out seeking to help Janko, encounters them and there is a confrontation between the father and son. The father wants all three of them to escape to Sweden, but the son does not. During a scuffle between the father and son, the rifle between them discharges and the son is fatally wounded. The film ends with the father Ketil following Janko to the Swedish border and bidding him farewell with the words Frihet for mennesket 'Freedom for mankind.'

Cast
 Ola Isene: Ketil
 Andreas Bjarke: Ivar
 Tom Tellefsen: Magnar, Ketil's son
 Milan Milosević: Janko
 Milivoj Zivanović: Miljan
 Liv Strømsted: Ragnhild
 Lalla Carlsen: Ane
 Helge Essmar: Guttorm
 Arne Lie: a Nazi
 Thor Hjorth-Jenssen: a Nazi
 Antun Nalis: Schwarz
 Ivan Jonas: Vlado
 Mihajlo Paskavljević: the doctor
 Aca Ognjatović: the actor
 Marijan Berger: Bojan
 Dobrica Stefanović: Milenko
 Janez Vhrovec: Vuk
 Ivica Kadić: Vjeko
 Rolf Søder: a soldier

References

External links 
 
 Norsk filmografi: Blodveien
 

World War II films based on actual events
1955 films
Norwegian war drama films
1950s war drama films
Norwegian historical drama films
Films set in Norway
World War II prisoner of war films
1950s Norwegian-language films
Serbo-Croatian-language films
1955 drama films
1950s historical drama films
Yugoslav historical drama films
Yugoslav war drama films
Yugoslav World War II films
Films directed by Kåre Bergstrøm
Norwegian black-and-white films
Yugoslav black-and-white films
1950s multilingual films
Norwegian multilingual films
Yugoslav multilingual films